The 16591 / 16592 Hampi Express is a daily Express running between the Mysuru and Hubballi Junction, the headquarters of the South Western Railway in India.  It is a train of the South Western Railway having primary maintenance at Hubballi.

History
This train was introduced earlier between Bengaluru and Hosapete after the gauge conversion between Bengaluru and Dharmavaram was completed. Later, it was extended to run till Hubballi. In 1996, a slip/link was attached to this train as the Nanded Link Express which became a separate train in 2010. In July 2013, this train was extended to Mysooru to provide direct connectivity between Mysore and Ballari among other places

The train is named after Hampi, an historical town belonging to the Vijayanagara Empire. The town is a tourist attraction for the ruins of the empire. This train passes through Hosapete that has the nearest station to this town.

Locomotive
The train is hauled by a Krishnarajapuram-based WAP-7 electric locomotive from end to end.

Coach composition
This train has one AC First Class-Two Tier combo, one Two Tier AC and one Three Tier AC coach, 9 sleeping coaches, 6 unreserved coaches and 2 second seating cum luggage rake. The train shares its rakes with 16535/36 Gol Gumbaz Express. Also the train has recently been augmented with one First Class Air Conditioned coach by duly replacing one First Class cum AC Two Tier coach.

Route & halts

Schedule

 16591 leaves Hubli every day at 6:20 PM to reach Mysore at 9:20 AM the next morning, covering 704 km in 15 hours at an average speed of 45 km/h
 16592 leaves Mysore at 7:00 PM to reach Hubli at 10:40 AM, taking 16 hours at an average speed of 44 kmph

Rake sharing
The train sharing its rake with 16535/16536 Gol Gumbaz Express.

Incidents and accidents
On 22 May 2012, the 16591 Hampi Express collided with a stationary goods train at Penukonda station killing 25 people and injuring 74.

References 

Named passenger trains of India
Transport in Hubli-Dharwad
Transport in Mysore
Rail transport in Karnataka
Rail transport in Andhra Pradesh
Express trains in India